Sampietro is a surname. Notable people with the surname include:

Antonio Sampietro (born 1953), Spanish politician
Francesco Sampietro (1815–1896), Spanish painter
Gianluca Sampietro (born 1993), Italian footballer
Mercedes Sampietro (born 1947), Spanish actress